Petri Oravainen (born 26 January 1983) is a Finnish former footballer, who represented HJK Helsinki and KuPS in the Veikkausliiga and FC Zwolle in the Netherlands. Oravainen, who is 177 cm tall, played as a winger on both left and right side. He made his debut at the senior level in 2001 at the age of 18.

Club career
Oravainen joined HJK as a thirteen-year-old. Before moving to Finnish top club's youth team, he had played in smaller junior clubs in the capital area. In 2001, he debuted in the first team and was said to be one of the most talented youth players in the league. In 2004, he was called up to the national team for the first time. However, a run of injuries disturbed his development and he could not really live up to the high expectations. He became one of the fans' favourites and especially his pace was a danger for many opponents.

He decided to take a look at playing abroad and signed a contract with FC Zwolle in the Dutch Eerste Divisie in 2006. He had a good start, but after another injury to his ankle he was out for several months and lost his place in the first team. After 16 matches and 4 goals, he moved back to Finland and joined his former club HJK Helsinki. In the 2008 season he played a total of 20 league games for 'Klubi' in which he scored four times.

'Pexi' had a big share in the victory over FC Honka in the Finnish Cup 2008 final. In own Finnair Stadium the home team beat the visitors from Espoo with 2–1 after extra time. Oravainen scored the winning goal after 114 minutes with a magnificent strike from just outside the penalty box. That goal delivered HJK the 10th Finnish Cup victory in its history and the third one for Oravainen himself.

Honours
HJK
Veikkausliiga: 2002, 2003, 2009
Finnish Cup:  2003, 2006, 2008

References

External links
 
 Profile at HJK.fi
 Stats at Veikkausliiga.com
 Guardian Football

1983 births
Living people
Finnish footballers
Association football midfielders
Helsingin Jalkapalloklubi players
Kuopion Palloseura players
Veikkausliiga players
PEC Zwolle players
Eerste Divisie players
Finland international footballers
Footballers from Helsinki